Gary Wayne VanDeaver (born September 25, 1958) is an American politician serving as the state representative for the Texas House of Representatives' 1st district, which currently encompasses Bowie, Franklin, Lamar, and Red River counties in northeastern Texas. In 2022, the new House District 1 includes Bowie, Cass, Lamar, Morris, and Red River Counties. He is a retired lifelong educator with the New Boston Independent School District in New Boston, Texas, where he still resides. VanDeaver has been re-elected by his district three times, in 2016, 2018, and 2020. He has defeated the previous incumbent, George Lavender, twice, the second time by an even larger margin. He identifies as a Conservative Republican, and is seeking re-election to his House seat for a fifth term in 2022.

Background
VanDeaver was born in Grimes County south of College Station, Texas.

Political Life
VanDeaver defeated George Lavender in a rematch in the Republican primary on March 1, 2016. VanDeaver received 18,263 votes (61.9 percent) to Lavender's 11,242 (38.1 percent).

VanDeaver ran unopposed in the 2018 Republican primary. VanDeaver ran unopposed in the general election held on November 6, 2018; no Democrats or third party candidates filed to run for the legislative seat.

VanDeaver ran unopposed in the 2020 Republican primary. VanDeaver ran unopposed in the general election held on November 3, 2020; no Democrats or third party candidates filed to run for the legislative seat.

VanDeaver is running again in the 2022 Republican primary. VanDeaver is the only candidate in the race who has been endorsed by the Associated Republicans of Texas, National Rife Association, Texas Alliance for Life, Texans for Life Coalition, Combined Law Enforcement Associations of Texas, Texas Municipal Police Association, Texas Farm Bureau, National Federation of Independent Businesses, the Texas Southwestern Cattle Raisers Association, Texas Forestry PAC, Texas State Teachers Association, Association of Texas Professional Educators, and Governor Greg Abbott .

References

External links
 Gary VanDeaver for State Representative
 State legislative page
 Gary VanDeaver at the Texas Tribune

1958 births
Living people
Republican Party members of the Texas House of Representatives
People from Grimes County, Texas
People from Clarksville, Texas
People from New Boston, Texas
Texas A&M University–Commerce alumni
School superintendents in Texas
Baptists from Texas
21st-century American politicians
Educators from Texas